The Clermont-Ferrand tramway is a transit system located in the city of Clermont-Ferrand in the Auvergne-Rhône-Alpes region of France. It is a Translohr system, meaning it is guided by a single rail and powered by electricity from overhead wires.

However, there have been numerous plans for extension of the line, and for the system to expand to include other lines, B and C.

Clermont-Ferrand constructed its first tram system in 1890, but in 1956 the tramway was decommissioned in favor of new bus routes. The current Translohr system officially opened in 2006.

History

First tramway (1890-1956) 

The first tramline in Clermont-Ferrand was put into service on January 7, 1890 by the Electric Tramway Company of Clermont Ferrand. The Clermont-Ferrand tramway distinguished itself from other systems as it was the first to use electricity in France.

The first  tram track ran from Montferrand to Jaude. Shortly after this, an extension was opened to Royat on l'Avenue des Thermes. A total of 22 two-axle tramcars were put into service. In 1902, a section between Jaude and Place Delille, via Place Gaillard, opened. In 1913, a link to Cermont-Ferrand Train Station via Salins, and a short section between Place Gaillard et Fontgiève, were put into service.

Before the First World War, the Beaumont line was extended to Ceyrat. In 1928, a link to Aubière was created, following the route of Line 3 on Avenue Léon Blum.

At the end of the Second World War, the tram suffered many setbacks. As cars began to become more popular, the government did not focus any effort on public transportation systems, but instead on the expansion of roads and highways. The tramlines were gradually replaced by buses.

The last tram in Clermont-Ferrand ran on 17 March 1956. After this, public transportation in the city was solely by bus. In many places, the rails were paved over to make way for cars.

Modern tramway (2006-present) 

In the 1970s, concern over the consequences of automobile use increased. In the 1983 Elections, a tramway was proposed by Socialist mayor Roger Quilliot in his re-election campaign.

However, the tram project was only seriously considered starting in 1990. The development of the system was given to SOFRETU (now Systra), which proposed the building of two tramlines: one north–south line (which would eventually become Line A),  and an east–west line. In 1996, bids were solicited for the rolling stock for the tramway. 
Alstom proposed that Alstom Citadis trams be used for the system, and Alstom Citadis trams were bought for Line A on 14 October 1996. Thus, the first tramway followed SOFRETU's proposal, which corresponded to the present day Line A.

However, due to pressure from the Chamber of Commerce and industries in Clermont-Ferrand (mostly Michelin), this initial tramway project was halted. A revised project was developed in 2000. 
 
New bids were solicited in 2002, and the only bidders were: Irisbus with their Civis trolleybus, Bombardier with their TVR rail transit system, and Lohr Industrie with their Translohr system. The contract was ultimately won by Lohr Industrie due to pressure from the government and from Michelin.

Following a derailment during the testing phase, the inauguration of the first section was delayed by a month, but finally opened in November 2006. The rest of the line opened on August 27, 2007.

The line was closed for seven weeks in 2013 to renovate many stations platforms due to their deterioration.

Extensions 

In 2011, an extension of Line A to Vergnes was initiated. Work began in December 2011 and took almost 2 years.

On 14 December 2013, the  extension of Line A from Champratel to Vergnes opened to the public. This extension was part of the "Reorganization of Les Verges Region" program, mainly to ease access to the Stade Gabriel Montpied.

Stations

Currently, there are 34 stations on the Clermont-Ferrand Tramway. They are located in both Clermont-Ferrand and Aubière communes.

List of Stations

Rolling stock 

The tramway of Clermont-Ferrand uses Translohr technology. The initial fleet was 26 trains, but in September 2019, the fleet was expanded to 30 trains.

Every train has a maximum capacity of 238 people with around 40 sitting. Six trains were priced at approximately 14 million euros.

Accidents 

On 26 December 2009, around 7:10, a train crashed at La Pardieu station. No one was injured in the incident, but the train was completely destroyed. According to the French Bureau of Ground Transport Accident Investigation, the direct cause of the accident is due to the blocking of a brake because of the general corrosion of its actuating pad system, which neither the design or manufacturer allowed to seal. The spread of the fire resulted from the short distance and lack of firewall between the brakes and the bellows. Also, the investigators believed that materials not meeting French standards were present due to international imports.

On January 10, 2011, a tram derailed between the Carmes and Delille stations, injuring one person. According to a report by the French Bureau of Ground Transport Accident Investigation, the direct cause of the accident of this Translohr was the detachment of the guide rail from the wheel under the conductor's cabin. This report from the bureau put the Translohr system itself into question. 
The deterioration of the tire rollers accumulated at the guide roller and brought these rollers out of the guide rail, removing the guide and driving the vehicle into the wall. Also, the bureau underlined the number of accidents linked to the presence of certain foreign elements. The bureau demanded that Lohr Industrie replaced the parts with ones that would be more durable.

On November 9, 2011, a train derailed because the conductor of the train ignored a signal indicating that the track was not switched properly.

Network Map

Gallery

See also
 List of tram and light rail transit systems
 List of rubber-tyred tram systems

References

External links

Transport in Clermont-Ferrand
Tram transport in France
Railway lines opened in 2007